Imperial Consort Bohyeon Gwi-in of the Haeju Jeong clan (23 February 1882 – 1943) was a consort of the Korean King and Emperor Gojong of Korea.

Family
 Father
 Jeong Bangjigeo (정방지거)
 Aunt: Jeong Maria (정마리아)
 Husband
 Emperor Gojong of Korea (8 September 1952 - 21 January 1919) (고종 태황제)
 Son
 Prince Yi U (20 August 1915 – 25 July 1916) (이우, 李堣)

References 

1882 births
1943 deaths
Royal consorts of the Joseon dynasty